Rennell Glacier is a glacier,  long, in the Pioneer Heights, Heritage Range. It drains northwest, to the east of Inferno Ridge, to join Splettstoesser Glacier. Named by the University of Minnesota Geological Party to these mountains, 1963–64, for K.P. Rennell, biologist with the party.

References
 

Glaciers of Ellsworth Land